The 1975–76 Vancouver Canucks season was the team's 6th in the NHL. The Canucks made the playoffs for the second seasons in a row, losing in the preliminary round to the New York Islanders. This was the last time until the 1991–92 season that the team would have a winning season.

Regular season

Final standings

Schedule and results

Awards and records

Trophies and awards
Cyclone Taylor Award (Canucks MVP): Don Lever
Cyrus H. McLean Trophy (Canucks Leading Scorer): Dennis Ververgaert
Babe Pratt Trophy (Canucks Outstanding Defenceman): Dennis Kearns
Fred J. Hume Award (Canucks Unsung Hero): Mike Robitaille
Most Exciting Player: Bobby Lalonde
Molson Cup (Most 3 Star Selections): Bobby Lalonde

Draft picks
Vancouver's picks at the 1975 NHL Amateur Draft. The draft was held at the NHL Office in Montreal, Quebec.

See also
1975–76 NHL season

References

 

Vancouver Canucks season, 1975-76
Vancouver Canucks seasons
Vanc